Christian Nikles (born 26 December 1997) is a Bruneian sprint freestyle swimmer. 

He competed at the 2011 World Aquatics Championships in the 50 metre and 100 metre freestyle events, where he failed to advance to the semi finals.

In 2019, he represented Brunei at the 2019 World Aquatics Championships held in Gwangju, South Korea and he competed in the men's 50 metre freestyle and men's 100 metre freestyle events. In both events he did not advance to compete in the semi-finals.

See also 
 List of swimmers
 Brunei at the 2011 World Aquatics Championships

References 

Bruneian male freestyle swimmers
1997 births
Living people